The following is a list of medical organizations:

International 
World Federation of Neurosurgical Societies

Australia and New Zealand
Australasian College for Emergency Medicine
Australasian College of Dermatologists
Australian Medical Association
Australian and New Zealand College of Anaesthetists
Doctors Reform Society of Australia
National Prescribing Service
Royal Australasian College of Physicians
Royal Australasian College of Surgeons
Royal Australian and New Zealand College of Radiologists
Royal Australian College of General Practitioners
Royal Australian and New Zealand College of Psychiatrists
Royal Australian and New Zealand College of Obstetricians and Gynaecologists
Royal Australian and New Zealand College of Ophthalmologists
Royal Australian and New Zealand College of Radiologists
Royal College of Pathologists of Australasia

Asia

Hong Kong
Hong Kong College of Physicians

India
 Indian Orthopaedic Association
 Ibn Sina Academy of Medieval Medicine and Sciences
 Indian Academy of Pediatrics
 Academy of Family Physicians of India
 Indian Medical Association

Sri Lanka
College of Community Physicians of Sri Lanka

Africa
 South African Medical Association
 Nigerian Medical Association
 Seychelles Medical and Dental Council

Europe
Cardiovascular and Interventional Radiological Society of Europe (CIRSE)
European Academy of Allergy and Clinical Immunology (EAACI)
European Renal Association - European Dialysis and Transplant Association (ERA-EDTA)
European Society for Medical Oncology (ESMO)
European Society of Cardiology (ESC)
European Society of Radiology (ESR)

Denmark
Danish Medical Association

Germany
Association of the Scientific Medical Societies in Germany (AWMF)
German Agency for Quality in Medicine
German Medical Association
German Network for Evidence Based Medicine
Psychologie Verbund (PV)

Republic of Ireland
Irish College of General Practitioners
Irish College of Ophthalmologists
Irish Medical Organisation
Royal College of Physicians of Ireland
Royal College of Surgeons in Ireland

Spain
SEICAP

United Kingdom
Association of Anaesthetists of Great Britain and Ireland
British Geriatrics Society
British Medical Association
Royal College of Anaesthetists
Royal College of Emergency Medicine
Royal College of General Practitioners
Royal College of Midwives
Royal College of Nursing
Royal College of Obstetricians and Gynaecologists
Royal College of Ophthalmologists
Royal College of Paediatrics and Child Health
Royal College of Pathologists
Royal College of Physicians
Royal College of Physicians of Edinburgh
Royal College of Psychiatrists
Royal College of Radiologists
Royal College of Surgeons of England
Royal College of Surgeons of Edinburgh
Royal College of Physicians and Surgeons of Glasgow
Royal Medical Society
Royal Society of Medicine
Royal Society of Tropical Medicine and Hygiene

North America

Canada
Canadian Cardiovascular Society
Canadian Medical Association
College of Family Physicians of Canada
College of Physicians and Surgeons of Ontario
Libin Cardiovascular Institute of Alberta
Royal College of Physicians and Surgeons of Canada

United States
American Academy for Addiction Psychiatry
American Academy of Child and Adolescent Psychiatry 
American Academy of Dermatology
American Academy of Emergency Medicine
American Academy of Family Physicians
American Academy of Hospice and Palliative Medicine
American Academy of Otolaryngology–Head and Neck Surgery
American Academy of Medical Acupuncture
American Academy of Neurology
American Academy of Pediatrics
American Academy of Psychiatry and the Law
American Academy of Sleep Medicine
American Association for Geriatric Psychiatry
American Association of Orthodontists
American Association of Physician Specialists
American College of Cardiology
American College of Chest Physicians
American College of Emergency Physicians
American College of Gastroenterology
American College of Obstetricians and Gynecologists
American College of Physicians
American College of Preventive Medicine
American College of Radiology
American College of Surgeons
American Gastroenterological Association
American Medical Association
Massachusetts Medical Society
American Medical Women's Association
American Muslim Health Professionals
American Neuropsychiatric Association
American Psychiatric Association
American Psychoanalytic Association
American Roentgen Ray Society
American Society of Addiction Medicine
American Society of Anesthesiologists
American Society of Reproductive Medicine
Association of American Medical Colleges
Association of American Physicians and Surgeons
National Association of Emergency Medical Technicians
Radiological Society of North America
Society for Pediatric Radiology
Society of Interventional Radiology
Society of Hospital Medicine
Urgent Care Association of America

South America

Brazil
Brazilian Medical Association

Other areas
Cardiovascular System Dynamics Society (CSDS) 
Endocrine Society
Gynecologic Oncology Group
International Society of Biometeorology
World Medical Association
World Academy of Medical Sciences (WAMS)

References

 

Medical